Gammatricula is a genus of freshwater snails which have a gill and an operculum, gastropod mollusks or micromollusks in the family Pomatiopsidae.

Distribution 
The distribution of Gammatricula includes China.

Species
Species within the genus Gammatricula include:
 Gammatricula chinensis ..., 1990
 Gammatricula fujianensis (Liu, Zhang & Wang, 1983)
 Gammatricula shini (Habe, 1961)
 Gammatricula songi Davis, Chen & Yu, 1994

References

External links 

Pomatiopsidae